Immunophysics is a novel interdisciplinary research field using immunological, biological, physical and chemical approaches to elucidate and modify immune-mediated mechanisms and to expand our knowledge on the pathomechanisms of chronic immune-mediated diseases such as arthritis, inflammatory bowel disease, asthma and chronic infections.

Background 
Immune reactions are tightly regulated and usually self-limited. Dysregulation can result in chronic inflammatory diseases (immunochronicity). In addition to biochemical molecular mechanisms, physical factors influence the immune system. Such components include:
 Microenvironmental factors like tonicity, pH, oxygen pressure and the redox status of immune cells
 Mechanical factors, such as tissue pressure, cellular stiffness and cell motility
 Cell membrane physics such as membrane composition and particles
The research field of immunophysics aims to investigate the influence of these physicochemical parameters on the function of the immune system in health and disease.

Methods 
Immunophysical techniques include nuclear magnetic resonance spectroscopy, magnetic resonance imaging (MRI), dual-energy computed tomography, fluorescence-lifetime imaging microscopy, multispectral optoacoustic tomography (MSOT), high-throughput microfluidic cytometry, interferometric scattering microscopy (iSCAT) and cryogenic optical localization in 3D (COLD).

Applications 
Immunophysical research is considered to open new perspectives for the investigation of the pathomechanisms of immune-mediated inflammatory diseases, help to develop novel detection methods and diagnostic tools in these diseases and advance the treatment possibilities of such diseases.

See also 
 Inflammation

References

External links
 Department of Medicine 3, Universitätsklinikum Erlangen, FAU Erlangen-Nürnberg
 Department of Medicine 1, Universitätsklinikum Erlangen, FAU Erlangen-Nürnberg
 Institute of Clinical Microbiology, Immunology and Hygiene, Universitätsklinikum Erlangen, FAU Erlangen-Nürnberg
 Department of Infection Biology, Universitätsklinikum Erlangen, FAU Erlangen-Nürnberg
 Department of Chemistry and Pharmacy, Universitätsklinikum Erlangen, FAU Erlangen-Nürnberg 
 Max Planck Institute for the Science of Light
 BioMolecular Modeling & Design Laboratory 

Branches of immunology
Medical physics